Aszód is a town in Pest county, Hungary.

History 
During World War II, Aszód was captured on 7 December 1944 by Soviet troops of the 2nd Ukrainian Front in the course of the Budapest Offensive.

Notable residents
 Sándor Petőfi, Hungarian national poet and liberal revolutionary
 Podmanitzky family, Hungarian noble family
 Aristid von Würtzler, Hungarian harpist, composer, leader of the New York Harp Ensemble
 József Jung, Hungarian architect
 Sándor Sára, Hungarian cinematographer and film director
 Zoltán Huszárik, Hungarian film director, screenwriter, visual artist and actor
 Ignaz Aurelius Fessler, Hungarian ecclesiastic, politician, historian and freemason
 Zoltán Varga, Hungarian footballer, Olympic gold medalist at the 1964 Summer Olympics in Tokyo, Japan
 Duchess Maria Dorothea of Württemberg, Silesian noble, wife of Archduke Joseph, Palatine of Hungary and sister of the great-grandfather of Edward VIII and George VI (father of Queen Elizabeth II), Kings of the United Kingdom

External links 

  in Hungarian
 Street map 

Populated places in Pest County